Spalding is a surname. Notable people with the surname include:

A. G. Spalding (1850–1915), American baseball player and sporting goods manufacturer
Albert Spalding (violinist) (1888–1953), American composer and concert violinist
Al Spalding (naval architect) (1932–2022), American naval architect
Baird T. Spalding (1872–1953), English-American author
Brian Spalding (1923–2016), English professor, physics
Burleigh F. Spalding (1853–1934), Chief Justice of North Dakota
Catherine Spalding (1793–1858), American Roman Catholic nun
Charles F. Spalding (Chuck Spalding, 1919–2000), American heir, political advisor, television screenwriter and investment banker
Dick Spalding (1893–1950), American soccer player
Douglas Spalding (1840–1877), English biologist
Esperanza Spalding (born 1984) American jazz bassist and singer
Esta Spalding (born 1966), Canadian author and poet
Eva Ruth Spalding (1883-1969), English composer
Georg Ludwig Spalding (1762–1811), German philologist
George Spalding (1836–1915), U.S. Representative from Michigan
Harriet Mabel Spalding (1862–1935), American poet, litterateur
Henry H. Spalding (1803–1843), U.S. Presbyterian missionary, established the Lapwai Mission in 1836 in what is now Idaho
J. Mark Spalding (born 1965), American Roman Catholic bishop
Johann Joachim Spalding (1714–1804), German Protestant theologian
John Spalding (disambiguation), the name of several people
Kim Spalding (1915–2000), American film, television and theatre actor
Linda Spalding (born 1943), Canadian writer and editor
Mark Spalding (disambiguation), the name of several people
Martin John Spalding (1810–1872), bishop of Baltimore
Phebe Estelle Spalding (1859–1937), English professor and author
Phil Spalding (1957–2023), American bass player
Robert Spalding, U.S. Brigadier General in the U.S. Air Force, Defense Attaché to China, Beijing, Director for Strategic Planning, National Security Council, White House, author, senior fellow at Hudson Institute
Silsby Spalding (1886–1949), American businessman and politician; the first Mayor of Beverly Hills, California
Solomon Spalding (1761–1816), American clergyman, businessman, and author
Susan Marr Spalding (1841–1908), American poet
Thomas Spalding (1774–1851), United States Representative from Georgia
Volney Morgan Spalding (1849–1918), American botanist
William Spalding (disambiguation), the name of several people

Fictional characters
 Lionel Spalding, a character from Dunston Checks In, portrayed by Glenn Shadix
 Dr. Ryan Spalding, a character from Grey's Anatomy, portrayed by Brandon Scott

See also
 Spaulding (surname)
 Spalding, Lincolnshire

English-language surnames
Lists of people by surname
English toponymic surnames